Mario Zurlini (17 March 1942 – 16 February 2023) was an Italian professional football player and manager.

Career
Born in Parma, Zurlini played as a defender for Parma, Napoli and Matera.

Zurlini was later manager of a number of Italian sides. He died on 16 February 2023, at the age of 80.

References

1942 births
2023 deaths
Italian footballers
Association football defenders
Serie A players
Parma Calcio 1913 players
S.S.C. Napoli players
Matera Calcio players
U.S. Siracusa managers
Cavese 1919 managers
Benevento Calcio managers
S.S. Juve Stabia managers
Sportspeople from Parma